Szydłowski (feminine Szydłowska) is a Polish-language toponymic surname derived from placenames derived from the word szydło, "awl". Notable people include:
 Elżbieta Szydłowska (1748-1810), Polish aristocrat
 Irena Szydłowska, Polish archer
 Joseph Szydlowski (1896-1988), Polish-Israeli aeroengineer
 Shawn Szydlowski (born 1990), American hockey player
 Stanisława Szydłowska, Polish sprint canoer
 Teodor Szydłowski, nobleman, Palatine of Płock

 
Polish-language surnames
Occupational surnames